Yagati is a hobli in the southern state of Karnataka, India. It is located in the Kaduru taluk of Chikmagalur district.

At the 2011 India census, Yagati had a population of 2,674 (1,342 males, 1,332 females).

Yagati is located 60 km east of the district headquarters Chikkamagaluru, 12 km from Kadurhalli, and 201 km from the state capital Bangalore.

Farming is the main occupation with farmers mainly growing tender coconut and banana trees. Due to the water scarcity and draughts there has been a decline in farming.

Y. S. V. Datta was born in Yagati.

Religion 
Yagati houses many sacred temples, Sri Mallikarjuna Temple of Lord Shiva is considered as the native God. Yearly festive of Goddess Arekallamma is celebrated throughout the village. A rare monolithic stone of Lord Hanuman is worshipped in the Anjaneya temple.

References 

Villages in Chikkamagaluru district